This is a list of postage stamps and souvenir sheets issued by Pakistan Post from 2017 to present.

 1947 to 1966
 1967 to 1976
 1977 to 1986
 1987 to 1996
 1997 to 2006
 2007 to 2016
 2017 to present

2017 

 13th Economic Cooperation Organization (ECO) Summit at Islamabad – 6 March 2017
 Pakistan, the winner of the ICC Champions Trophy 2017 – 2 November 2017

2018 

 75 years of Army Burn Hall College, Abbottabad (1943–2018) – 5 March 2018
 The 10th Edition of International Defence Exhibition and Seminar (IDEAS) 2018 by Defence Export Promotion Organization – 27 November 2018

2019 

 Launch of Pakistan's First Remote Sensing Satellites PRSS-1 and PakTES-1A – 9 July 2019

2020 

 Kashmir Solidarity Day – 5 February 2020
 High-Level International Conference in Islamabad on 17–18 February 2020; 40 Years of Presence of Afghan Refugees in Pakistan – 17 February 2020

References 

2017